Runnymede Collegiate Institute (colloquially known as Runnymede CI, RCI, or Runnymede) is a public high school in Toronto, Ontario, Canada. The school first opened in 1927 and is operated by the Toronto District School Board. Runnymede has a population of 500 students and has a variety of course offerings ranging from computer technology to co-operative education, from modern languages to music. The motto of this school is Vestigia Nulla Retrorsum ("No Steps Back").

History
Runnymede Collegiate Institute was completed and officially opened on November 11, 1927, although classes had begun on September 6 for 250 students and a staff of 10 teachers led by Principal Bruce W. Clark. The original Collegiate Gothic building was designed by Charles Wellington Smith and consisted of eight classrooms, three science labs, an auditorium, a library, a gymnasium, a cafeteria and a locker area on three floors.  Significant additions to the building were completed in 1928, 1958 and 1966.  The building now includes over 30 classrooms, a swimming pool, two gyms, computers labs and a large cafeteria.

The school was built on land, which had belonged to John Scarlett. His estate was called "Runnymede" after the field of Runnymede, where King John of England signed Magna Carta.  The school's colours, red and white, derive partly from Scarlett's name, and also from the fact that the school opened in the year of Canada's Diamond Jubilee.  Owing to their red school jackets, Runnymede students came to be known as Redmen in the 1930s.  Over time an Indian head logo was adopted to go with the name. The Redmen name and logo were retired in 1994.

Prior to 1998, the school was part of the Board of Education for the City of York.

Clubs

Runnymede Collegiate Institute offers a number of different clubs and extracurricular activities.
Some of the activities that have run in recent years are listed below:
 Badminton Club
 Baseball (boys and girls)
 Basketball (varsity, junior and senior)
 Black Students Association club
 Cheerleading
 Cross Country
 Dance Club
 FIRST Robotics Competition (Robotics) Team 1310
 Hockey (co-ed)
 Celebration Club
 Leadership
 Math Club
 Mental Health and Wellness Club
 GSA Club
 Right to Play
 Soccer (junior and senior)
 Swim Team
 Tech Crew
 Track and Field
 Volleyball (Junior and senior girls, co-ed)
 Yearbook Club

The Robotics Team is the biggest club in Runnymede with over 60 students every year.

Mountview Alternative School
Mountview Alternative School is a Kindergarten to Grade 8 school that shares space with Runnymede Collegiate Institute and Humbercrest Nursery School. The school was founded in 1983 in the Keele Street Public School building and has approximately 100 students. Mountview was relocated to its present location at Runnymede Collegiate in 2018.

Notable alumni
 Frederick George Topham - recipient of the Victoria Cross in World War II
 Dwight Drummond - news anchor on CBC Toronto
 P. K. Subban - Defenceman, Nashville Predators
 Jim Peplinski - Captain of the Calgary Flames during their 1988-89 Stanley Cup Victory
 Lori-Ann Muenzer - 2004 Olympic Gold Medalist in the Women's Sprint cycling
 James Milton Ham, scientist and 10th President of the University of Toronto
 Claude Bissell, Canada's youngest university president
 Charlotte Sullivan, actress
 Dick Aldridge, Linebacker, Toronto Argonauts & Hamilton Tigercats
 Ted Woloshyn, CFRB Radio Host
 Howard Moscoe, city councillor 
 Gayle Christie, former York mayor 
 Katie Telford, Chief of Staff to Prime Minister Justin Trudeau
 Annamie Paul, Leader, Green Party of Canada

See also
List of high schools in Ontario

References

External links

Runnymede Collegiate Institute website
 Runnymede Collegiate Institute on TOBuilt

Toronto District School Board
Schools in the TDSB
High schools in Toronto
Educational institutions established in 1927
1927 establishments in Ontario